Katherine Mary Humble (born 12 December 1968) is an English television presenter and narrator, mainly working for the BBC, specialising in wildlife and science programmes. Humble served as president of the Royal Society for the Protection of Birds from 2009 until 2013. She is an ambassador for the UK walking charity Living Streets.

Early life and education 
Born in Wimbledon, London, to IBM employee Nick Humble and Diana (née Carter), she is the granddaughter of Bill Humble, a well-known pre-Second World War aviator. She is also the great-great-great granddaughter of Joseph Humble, colliery manager of Hartley Colliery at the time of the Hartley Colliery disaster. She has a brother. She grew up in Bray in Berkshire and attended the Abbey School in Reading. She later said of her schooling:

After leaving school she travelled through Africa from Cape Town to Cairo, doing various jobs including waitressing, driving safari trucks and working on a crocodile farm. She has returned to Africa many times since. In 1994, she travelled around Madagascar, the subject of her first article for The Daily Telegraph travel section. Since then she has written articles about diving and cycling in Cuba, an 'exploding' lake in Cameroon and hippopotamus conservation work in Ghana.

Career 
In 1990, Humble appeared for the first time as an actress in a TV production, Spymaker: The Secret Life of Ian Fleming, and was credited as "Lauren Heston … The redhead". She was the assistant to a casting director who was looking for an actress to play a brief nude scene, and she got the job herself.

Humble started her television career as a researcher, later transferring to presenting programmes such as Top Gear, Tomorrow's World and the 2001 series The Holiday Programme – You call the shots where the team travelled the world doing whatever viewers recommended using the then-novel media of text messaging and emailing the team as they travelled.

Humble has specialised in presenting wildlife programmes, including Animal Park, Springwatch and Autumnwatch with Bill Oddie, Simon King, Chris Packham and Martin Hughes-Games and later, Wild in Africa and Seawatch.

From 2000 to 2005, she presented a BBC series called Rough Science, in which a number of scientists were set various challenges to be solved using basic tools and supplies.

Humble presented The Blue Planet Live! on the 2008 UK tour at Wembley Arena, St David's Hall in Cardiff and at Symphony Hall in Birmingham.

Her BBC television series, The Hottest Place On Earth, is a record of a month spent living with the Afar people in Ethiopia's hostile Danakil Depression.

She occasionally performs on the lecture circuit with a show based on her experiences with wildlife, titled Harassed by Hippos and Battered by Cod: A Humble Way to Make a Living.

On 16 February 2009, she made her first appearance in Countdown'''s Dictionary Corner.

She founded the web site Stuff Your Rucksack that helps organisations around the world find the items they need by matching them with travellers.

On 29 July 2009, Humble was the subject for the programme Who Do You Think You Are? where she discovered that she had family connections to the Hartley Colliery disaster. Her paternal grandfather Bill Humble was a test pilot who tested the Hawker Tempest and her maternal grandfather Stan Carter was an officer in the RAF and after being shot down was held as a prisoner of war in Stalag Luft III at the time of "The Great Escape".

In August 2009, Humble presented a series of programmes for the BBC in which she made a two thousand mile journey across the Middle East, following the ancient frankincense trade route of Arabia which first connected the Arab world with the West. The series culminates in her presenting frankincense, that she has carried throughout the journey, to be used in a Christmas service at the Church of the Nativity in Bethlehem.

On 3 October 2009, Humble was appointed president of the Royal Society for the Protection of Birds. In 2013, Humble was succeeded as President of the RSPB by Miranda Krestovnikoff.

In 2010, Humble described being on holiday in the north-eastern region of Afghanistan where there were no signs of conflict, but where the Wakhi people were expected to be hostile. Instead, Humble said they were "amongst the most astonishing, hospitable, warm, genuine people" she has ever met. They were also hard and tough, and Humble believes that "if anyone thinks they are going to win a war against an Afghan they are insane!" She is writing about her experiences in Afghanistan for a forthcoming publication.

From 3 to 7 May 2010 she appeared as the dictionary corner guest on Countdown.

In February 2011, Humble presented a three-part series of programmes, The Spice Trail, on the trail of six of the world's most valuable spices revealing their history, trade, mythology and usage.

In March 2012, she co-presented with Dr Helen Czerski a three part BBC series, Orbit. In July, Humble co-presented Volcano Live with Professor Iain Stewart.

In 2017 Humble presented the BBC Two documentary series Extreme Wives with Kate Humble. In the first episode she visited the Kuria people in Kenya and explored issues of polygamy and female genital mutilation. In the second episode she spoke to members of the Haredi orthodox Jewish community in Jerusalem. The third episode meets the matrilineal community of Shillong in the Indian state of Meghalaya. In 2018 she became president of the Wildfowl & Wetlands Trust.

Humble's book, Thinking on My Feet: The small joy of putting one foot in front of another, was shortlisted for the 2019 Wainwright Prize.

In November 2020 she was included in the BBC Radio 4 Woman's Hour Power list 2020.

 Personal life 
Humble is married to the television producer Ludo Graham. They first met when she was aged 16, and married in Newbury, Berkshire, in 1992, when she was 23. In 2007, they moved from Chiswick, West London, to the village of Trellech in the Wye Valley, where they had wanted to live for "a very long time". Humble now owns her own farm after working on Lambing Live. She has a sheep called Humble, named after her, that currently lives with her friend and colleague Adam Henson. Humble reacted to public criticism on ITV's Lorraine about her lack of intent to have children stating that "I don’t want them, I’ve never wanted them".

Humble is a naturist who "likes to get closer to nature by being naked". About being naked, she says "There's something joyous about it, and I urge everyone to try it".

Humble is an honorary graduate of the Open University. She is a beekeeper and a member of the British Beekeepers Association.

 Works 

 Television 

 Holidays Out (1997)
 Holiday (1998–2000)
 The Essential Guide to Rocks (1998)
 Holiday: Fasten Your Seat Belt '98 (1998)
 Top Gear Waterworld (1998)
 Holiday Snaps (1999–2001)
 Webwise (1999)
 Top Gear (1999–2000)
 Holiday on a Shoestring (2000–2001)
 Esc@pe (2000)
 Chef SOS (2000)
 Countryfile (2000–2004)
 Animal Park (2000–2009, 2016—)
 Rough Science (2000–2005)
 Holiday: You Call The Shots (2001–2003)
 Ever Wondered: Colour – Blissfully Blue (2001)
 Ever Wondered: Extremes – Surviving Antarctica (2001)
 Rolf's Amazing World of Animals (2001)
 City Hospital (2001–2004)
 Tomorrow's World (2002)
 The Abyss: Live (2002–2003)
 Restoration (2003; series 1 final)
 The Murder Game (2003)
 Wild In Your Garden (2003)
 Test Your Pet (2004)
 Britain Goes Wild with Bill Oddie (2004)
 Amazon Abyss (2005)
 Animal Park – Wild in Africa (2005–2006)
 Springwatch (2005–2011)
 Best of Springwatch with Bill Oddie (2005)
 Autumnwatch (2006–2010)
 Seawatch (2006)
 The One Show (2006)
 Climate Change: Britain Under Threat (2007)
 Animal Park – Wild on the West Coast (2007)
 Pacific Abyss (2007)
 Ultimate Caving (2007)
 Britain's Lost World (2007)
 One Man and His Dog (2008)
 The Hottest Place on Earth (2008)
 Who Do You Think You Are? (29 July 2009)
 The Frankincense Trail (2009)
 Lambing Live (2010–2014)
 Birds Britannia (2010)
 The Spice Trail (2011)
 Orbit: Earth's Extraordinary Journey (2012)
 Winterwatch (2012)
 Volcano Live (2012)
 Airport Live (2013)
 Wild Shepherdess with Kate Humble (2013)
 The Secret Life of the Sun (2013)
 Kew On A Plate (2014)
 Kate Humble: Into the Volcano (2015)
 Wild Things (2015)
 Building Cars Live (2015)
 Let's Play Darts (2016)
 Chinese New Year: The Biggest Celebration on Earth (2016)
 Curious Creatures (2017)
 Extreme Wives with Kate Humble (2017)
 Back to the Land with Kate Humble (2017)
 Kate Humble: Off the Beaten Track (2018)
 Curious Creatures (2018)
  A Country Life for Half the Price with Kate Humble (2020)
 Escape To The Farm (2020–)
 Kate Humble's Coastal Britain (2021)
 Kate Humble: Good Life, Green Life'' (2021)

Books

References

External links 
 
 BBC homepage of Kate Humble
 
 Online chat with Kate on her "Holiday – You Call The Shots" experiences
 Guardian interview on SeaWatch series
 Humble's charity Stuff Your Rucksack

1968 births
Living people
English naturalists
English television presenters
BBC television presenters
People from Bray, Berkshire
People from Wimbledon, London
People from Monmouthshire
Royal Society for the Protection of Birds people
People educated at The Abbey School
British naturists
Top Gear people
Wildfowl & Wetlands Trust